Olguin or Olguín is a surname. Notable people with the surname include:

Adriana Olguín (1911–2015), Chilean lawyer and politician
Carlos Olguin-Trelawny, Argentine film director and screenwriter
Felipe Solís Olguín (1944–2009), Mexican archaeologist, anthropologist and historian
Fernando M. Olguin (born 1961), American judge
Héctor Pedraza Olguín (born 1966), Mexican politician
Jorge Olguín (born 1952), Argentine footballer
Jorge Olguín (born 1973/1974), Chilean film director
José Olguín, Chilean footballer
Leonardo Olguín (born 1975), Argentine tennis player
Luciano Olguín (born 1982), Argentine footballer
Néstor Olguín (born 1988), Mexican footballer
Otilio Olguín (born 1931), Mexican swimmer and water polo player 
Roy Argel Gómez Olguín (born 1973), Mexican politician
Sergio Olguín, Argentinean author, journalist and literary critic